The 1963 Summer Universiade, also known as the III Summer Universiade, took place in Porto Alegre, Brazil.

Sports at the 1963 Summer Universiade
 Athletics
 Basketball
 Diving
 Fencing
 Gymnastics
 Swimming
 Tennis
 Volleyball
 Water polo

Medal table

 
1963
U
U
Summer Universiade
Universiade
Sports in Porto Alegre
August 1963 sports events in South America
September 1963 sports events in South America